Corrado Fantini (born 7 February 1967) is a former Italian shot putter. His personal best was 20.78 metres.

Biography
He ranks fourth on the Italian all-time lists for the event. His daughter is the hammer thrower Sara Fantini.

Achievements

References

External links
 

1967 births
Living people
People from Fidenza
Italian male shot putters
Olympic athletes of Italy
Athletes (track and field) at the 1996 Summer Olympics
World Athletics Championships athletes for Italy
Mediterranean Games silver medalists for Italy
Mediterranean Games medalists in athletics
Athletes (track and field) at the 1997 Mediterranean Games
Sportspeople from the Province of Parma